Sergei Anatolyevich Tkachyov (born 19 May 1989) is a Russian professional football player who plays as a right midfielder or attacking midfielder for   Arsenal Tula.

Career

Club
On 11 January 2016, Tkachyov signed a four-year contract with CSKA Moscow.

On 2 July 2018, Tkachyov returned to FC Arsenal Tula on a season-long loan deal. Tkachyov scored five goals in 25 Russian Premier League matches during the 2018–19 season.

On 27 June 2019, he moved to Arsenal on a permanent basis, signing a 2-year contract.

Honours
Lokomotiv Moscow
Russian Cup winner: 2014–15 (played in the early stages of the competition)

Kuban Krasnodar
Russian Cup finalist: 2014–15 (played in the late stages of the competition)

Career statistics

Club

References

External links

Profile at CSKA Moscow official site

 Profile at FC Lokomotiv Moscow official site
Sergei Tkachyov at Footballdatabase

1989 births
People from Bogucharsky District
Sportspeople from Voronezh Oblast
Living people
Russian footballers
Russia youth international footballers
Association football midfielders
FC Fakel Voronezh players
PFC Krylia Sovetov Samara players
FC Metalist Kharkiv players
FC Ural Yekaterinburg players
FC Sevastopol players
FC Lokomotiv Moscow players
FC Kuban Krasnodar players
PFC CSKA Moscow players
FC Arsenal Tula players
Russian Premier League players
Russian First League players
Russian Second League players
Ukrainian Premier League players
Ukrainian First League players
Russian expatriate footballers
Expatriate footballers in Ukraine
Russian expatriate sportspeople in Ukraine